The South Brunswick Public Schools are a comprehensive community public school district, serving students in pre-kindergarten through twelfth grade from South Brunswick Township in Middlesex County, New Jersey, United States.

As of the 2020-2021 school year, the district, comprising 10 schools, had an enrollment of 8,280 students and 608.0 classroom teachers (on an FTE basis), for a student–teacher ratio of 13.6:2.

The district has grown substantially in recent decades, with district enrollment more than doubling in the two decades from 1991 and high school enrollment doubling to nearly 2,000 in the decade prior to 2001 and increasing by another 1,000 in the subsequent decade. However, its enrollment has recently declined the past couple of years, from 8,623 students in the 2018-19 school year down to 8,280 last school year. 

The district is classified by the New Jersey Department of Education as being in District Factor Group "I", the second-highest of eight groupings. District Factor Groups organize districts statewide to allow comparison by common socioeconomic characteristics of the local districts. From lowest socioeconomic status to highest, the categories are A, B, CD, DE, FG, GH, I and J.

Awards and recognition
Five of the district's schools have received the National Blue Ribbon Award of Excellence from the United States Department of Education, the highest honor that an American school can achieve: South Brunswick High School (1990–91), Greenbrook School (1991–92), Crossroads Middle School (1992–93), Cambridge Elementary School (1996–97), Constable Elementary School (2000–01).

Five of South Brunswick's schools have been named as a "Star School" by the New Jersey Department of Education, the highest honor that a New Jersey school can achieve:
Cambridge Elementary School in the 1993-94 school year, 
Dayton Elementary School in the 1993-94 school year, 
Indian Fields Elementary School in the 1993-94 school year, 
Monmouth Junction Elementary School in the 1998-99 school year,  and
South Brunswick High School in the 2000-01 school year

Indian Fields School was recognized by Governor Jim McGreevey in 2003 as one of 25 schools selected statewide for the First Annual Governor's School of Excellence award.

SBHS was one of 433 schools to be recognized by the CollegeBoard on their 7th Annual AP District Honor Roll. SBHS is also home to the award-winning Viking Marching Band, which swept the 2013 New Jersey state championship to win its seventh state title.

Schools
Schools in the district (with 2021-2022 enrollment data from the National Center for Education Statistics) are:
Elementary schools
Brooks Crossing and Deans Elementary School (584 students; in grades K-5)
Jaime Maccarone, Principal
Aju Mathews, Assistant Principal
Brunswick Acres Elementary School (477; K-5)
Stacey Ta, Principal
Laura Cervino, Assistant Principal
Cambridge Elementary School (488; PreK-5)
Christi Pemberton, Principal
Jaya Maharajh, Assistant Principal
Constable Elementary School (470; K-5)
Cristina Vildostegui-Cerra, Principal
Dominique Talbot, Assistant Principal
Greenbrook Elementary School (379; K-5)
Jodi Mahoney, Principal
Sandra Burghgraef-Fehte, Assistant Principal
Indian Fields and Dayton Elementary School (598; K-5)
Peter Rattien, Principal
Allison Dubois, Assistant Principal
Monmouth Junction Elementary School (326; PreK-5)
Shaun Ruymen, Principal
Vacant, Assistant Principal
Middle schools
Crossroads Middle School North (843; 6-8)
Kimberly Bynoe, Principal
Mark Riccardi, Assistant Principal
Meg Berry, Assistant Principal
Crossroads Middle School South (1,071; 6-8)
Bonnie Capes, Principal
Sondra Hinson, Assistant Principal
Mark Kmiec, Assistant Principal
High school
South Brunswick High School (2,977; 9-12)
Peter Varela, Principal
Emanuel Caravano, Assistant Principal for the Class of 2023
Brian McManus, Assistant Principal for the Class of 2024
Yoshi Donato, Assistant Principal for the Class of 2025/James Kimple Center
Vanessa Moreno, Assistant Principal for the Class of 2026
Michael Scheese, Assistant Principal for Academic Leadership

Administration
Core members of the district's administration are:
Scott Feder, Superintendent
Suzanne Luck-Born, Assistant Superintendent
Dr. Evelyn Mamman, Assistant Superintendent for Curriculum, Instruction & Administration
Kimberly Maloy-White, Assistant Superintendent for Human Resources
David E. Pawlowski, School Business Administrator / Board Secretary

Board of education
The district's board of education, with nine members, sets policy and oversees the fiscal and educational operation of the district through its administration. As a Type II school district, the board's trustees are elected directly by voters to serve three-year terms of office on a staggered basis, with three seats up for election each year held (since 2012) as part of the November general election.

References

External links
South Brunswick Public Schools
 
School Data for the South Brunswick Public Schools, National Center for Education Statistics

South Brunswick, New Jersey
New Jersey District Factor Group I
School districts in Middlesex County, New Jersey